"Stuff Like That There" is a song that was performed by The King Sisters in the 1945 film On Stage Everybody, with music by Jay Livingston and lyrics by Ray Evans. It was recorded in December 1945 by Betty Hutton.

In 1991, the song was performed by Bette Midler in the motion picture For the Boys.

References

Bette Midler songs
Songs with music by Jay Livingston
1944 songs
Songs with lyrics by Ray Evans